The Public Order Emergency Commission (POEC), also known as the Rouleau inquiry or the Inquiry into Emergencies Act  was a public inquiry in Canada that investigated the invoking of the Emergencies Act on February 14, 2022 by the government of Prime Minister Justin Trudeau during the Canada convoy protests. It was the first time the Emergencies Act had been invoked and it remained in place from February 14–23, 2022, the POEC investigated the rational for invoking the Emergencies Act and the measures taken for dealing with the emergency". The inquiry was led by commissioner Justice Paul Rouleau, who was appointed by Prime Minister Justin Trudeau on April 25, 2022. Justice Rouleau had a surgical intervention which delayed the inquiry from  September 19, 2022 to mid-October. The inquiry is independent of the parliamentary review committee. 

Public hearings were held at the Winifred Bambrick Room in Ottawa from October 13 until December 2, 2022. During the 31 days of hearings which spanned six weeks, 77 witnesses provided testimonies and were questioned by lawyers. About 7,000 documents including "text and email messages, cabinet documents, transcripts and witness statements" were submitted. Along with these documents, on November 16, the inquiry heard summaries of the 9,500 submissions made by the general public who had replied to the request for submissions from August through October 31st. Videos and transcripts of all the public hearings were made available online. On November 28, the policy phase began with a series of discussions on potential recommendations.

The five volumes of the Report of the Public Inquiry into the 2022 Public Order Emergency were released on February 17, 2023. The report found that the Trudeau government met the "very high threshold" for invoking the Emergencies Act after failures by police and politicians to address the protests.

A government press release said it is hoped investigations will "prevent these events from happening again".

Questions to be examined and assessed

The enquiry examines and assesses whether there was Canada's security as defined under the Canadian Security Intelligence Service Act could be deemed to be a "national emergency"an "urgent", "critical situation". Were there serious threats to the "lives, health or safety of Canadians"? The inquiry investigates whether the "capacity or authority" of a province to deal with the urgent situation, is exceeded. It will also review whether Canada's sovereignty, security and territorial integrity" were "seriously threatened". A crucial question for the inquiry is whether the "national emergency" could not have been "effectively dealt with under any other law of Canada". Threats to Canada's security as defined by the Intelligence Service Act include the violent overthrow of the Canadian government, "foreign influenced activities", "espionage", "sabotage" threats of serious violence against individuals fuelled by ideology, politics, or religion. The Rouleau inquiry is not mandate to determine who was at fault or to assign liability for what happened during the Canada convoy protest early 2022. The inquiry's role is to determine whether Prime Minister Trudeau was justified by law to invoke the Emergencies Act, which will become part of his political legacy. It will also determine "whether and how" the Emergencies Act could be used in the future. Before the public hearings began in October, Conservatives had raised concerns in April that investigations were too focused on the actions of protesters and their fundraising, and not on justifying the use of the Emergencies Act or determining whether it was appropriate for it to have been invoked.

Attorneys and witnesses
Co-lead Commission Counsel were Shantona Chaudhury and Jeffrey Leon, and senior inquiry lawyers included Frank Au, Natalia Rodriguez, Gabriel Poliquin and Dan Sheppard. Other lawyers included Tom Curry who represented the former Ottawa police chief Peter Sloly. Paul Champ represented Ottawa citizens and businesses. Brendan Miller represented some of the protestors. Prime Minister Justin Trudeau appeared as witness on November 25.

Witnesses during the hearings related to the role played by the police, included OPP retired Chief Superintendent Carson Pardy.

Hearings and documents
Public hearings began on October 13 and run until December 2, 2022. There were 31 days of testimony with 77 witnesses. About 7,000 documents were submitted to the hearings in the form of "text and email messages, cabinet documents, transcripts and witness statements".

Factual stage 
During the six weeks of the inquiry's public hearings from October 13 through December 2the factual stage of the inquirytestimonies from about 77 witnesses were heard. This includes "protest participants, law enforcement representatives, federal cabinet ministers and officials with provincial and municipal governments". During the first week of public hearings, the focus was on documents and testimonies tracing the communication of CSIS, OPP, and OPS intelligence reports. Following Rouleau's opening statement, the parties who had been granted standing at the Commission delivered a brief opening statement. On October 14, the second day of hearings, four Ottawa residents, representatives of the Business Improvement Area (BIA), and two Ottawa city councillors provided their statements on how they and their constituents and people they represent, experienced the protests, including Victoria De La Ronde, Zexi Li, Nathalie Carrier, and Kevin McHale. De La Ronde, who described herself as having a visual impairment, said she felt "trapped and helpless." 

From October 17 through October 19 other City of Ottawa representative provided their testimonies. From October 19 through October 31, representatives of the Ontario Provincial Police (OPP) and the Ottawa Police Service (OPS) were questioned including retired Chief Superintendent Carson Pardy on October 20, Pat Morris, the head of the OPP's Provincial Operations Intelligence Bureau (POIB) Superintendent, Patricia Ferguson, acting deputy chief of the Ottawa Police Service., and Peter Sloly, who was questioned on October 28 and 31. OPP Superintendent Craig Abrams testified on October 20 and October 21. He was questioned by lawyers Tom Curry, Paul Champ. Convoy lawyer Alan Honner questioned Pardy about the numbers of OPP members deployed. OPP lawyer Chris Diana questioned Ferguson about "Project Hendon" reports.

A full week from November 1 to November 5 was devoted to testimonies by protesters starting with the first person to allegedly conceive of the protests, Brigitte Belton, and then Chris Barberwho had travelled to Ottawa from Saskatchewan with Tamara Lich during the protests. Paul Champ, who represented Ottawa residents and business owners, said that Judge Rouleau had only allowed two hours for his clients' evidence in contrast to amount of time that he had allocated for Ottawa convoy protest leaders and organizersPat King, Benjamin Dichter, Tom Marazzo, Chris Barber, Lich, Jeremy MacKenzie. Protesters were given extra allowances to share lengthy monologues, grievances, conflicts, motivations, and to answer questions for several days. MacKenzie, described in a Globe and Mail article as the "creator" of a far-right, anti-government group, Diagolon, told the inquiry that an RCMP officer was leaking information to him during the protests.

From November 7 through November 11 officials from Windsor, Coutts, the provinces of Ontario and Alberta, provided testimonies related to protests that blocked international borders. 

On November 16, Commission Counsel Jeffrey Leon announced that there would be a presentation of an overview summary of the estimated 9,500 public submissions sent in from August through October 31st.  The November 14 through November 18 hearings included testimonies from representatives of federal ministries and the Privy Council Office, along with the RCMP Commissioner, Brenda Lucki and RCMP Deputy Commissioners. 

Testimonies from representatives of the Canadian Security Intelligence Service and the Integrated Terrorism Assessment Centre, along with Ministers Bill Blair of the Emergency Preparedness and president of the King's Privy Council, Public Safety Minister Marco Mendicino, Intergovernmental Affairs Minister Dominic LeBlanc, Justice Minister, David Lametti, National Defence Minister Anita Anand, Transport Canada Minister Omar Alghabra, Deputy Prime Minister and Finance Chrystia Freeland were heard in the final week of hearings, from November 21 through November 25. The final testimony was that of Prime Minister Justin Trudeau.

Policy phase

The policy phase of the inquiry began on November 28 with round-table discussions with experts in specific fields, such as social media, disinformation, and constitutional law to deepen Commissioner Rouleau's understanding of these issues and to suggest recommendations. 

On December 2, the final day of this stage, six constitutional law experts provided testimonies.

Final report
The five volumes of the Report of the Public Inquiry into the 2022 Public Order Emergency were released on February 17, 2023 three days ahead of schedule. 

The first volume provides an overview and recommendations; volumes two and three include the analysis of evidence, the fourth volume explains of how the POEC worked, and volume five included commissioned papers by academic experts.

In volume one, Rouleau clarified that the Charter's "robust protection" for protests has reasonable limits".

Media response
A December 2 Globe and Mail article said that while, in the writer's opinion, the invocation of the Act was not necessary, the inquiry itself was a win for open democracy as Canadians were given an opportunity to see how "people they elect actually do their jobs." Top government officials had to explain in detail and in public their reasons for their actions with accompanying documents available for anyone to see.

Notes

See also
 Emergencies Act

Citations

References

A
 
B
  
  
  
  
C
 
 
 
 
F
 
 
 
G 
  Day 15
  Day 16
 
H
 
K
 
L
 
M
 
  
  Day 16
  Day 16
 
 
 
N 
 
 
O
 
P
 
 
 
  
 
 
 
 
 

S
 
T
 
 
 
 
 
Q

External links
 
 
 
 
 
 

2022 in Canadian law
Canadian federal legislation
Emergency laws
Legal history of Canada
Canadian commissions and inquiries